The Čajniče Monastery with its Church of the Assumption of the Blessed Mother of God is a Serbian Orthodox monastery located in Čajniče, Bosnia and Herzegovina, Republika Srpska. 

There are, actually, two churches side by side, the new and the old one. The old church dates from 15th century, and the new one was built in 1857. The church is known for the miraculous icon of the Holy Virgin. This is the only extant example of icon painting in Bosnia dating from pre-Ottoman times. It is the processional icon of the Virgin and Child painted on one side, and of St. John the Baptist on the other. Popularly known as the Čajniče Beauty and deemed miraculous, the icon comes from the Church of the Assumption, a traditional place of pilgrimage. It is the work of a Byzantine artist painted in the first half of the fourteenth century, or as historians estimate, around 1329–1330.

Čajniče Gospel
The museum of the Church of the Assumption of the Blessed Mother of God keeps the Čajniče Gospel, the oldest gospel written in Bosnia, which probably belonged to the Bosnian noble family Radinović-Pavlović, and is the only medieval Bosnian gospel that has been preserved in country to this day. It probably originate at the beginning of the 15th century, and by evaluating the language characteristics and its Ijekavian dialect, it is certain that it originate from ijekavijan eastern Bosnia. The codex was written in shorthand, with a semi-constitution of the Bosnian type, also known as Bosnian Cyrillic. It is estimated that five main scribes took turns, continuously writing the text. The Čajniče Gospel is a four-gospel, and only parts of the Gospel of Matthew, the Gospel of Mark, and most of the Gospel of Luke have been preserved, while the Gospel of John, the beginning and end of the manuscript, and a certain number of pages in the middle are lost, so that in present condition the manuscript has 167 pages. The codex is declared a National monument of Bosnia and Herzegovina.

See also
Zavala Monastery

References

 

Čajniče
Serbian Orthodox monasteries in Bosnia and Herzegovina
Buildings and structures in Republika Srpska